Johann Georg Megerle von Mühlfeld (July 22, 1780 in Vienna – September 15, 1831, also in Vienna) was an Austrian naturalist.

From 1802 on he worked as the curator's assistant at the entomological collection of the Natural-Animal Cabinet in Vienna. He later became an official in the administration.

He published the Mineralogical Pocket Book (Mineralogisches Taschenbuch, enthaltend eine Oryctographie von Unterösterreich zum Gebrauche reisender Mineralogen) in 1807, but abandoned mineralogy thereafter. In 1813, he published Österreichs Färbepflanzen (Austria's Dying Plants).

He was the younger son of Johann Baptist Megerle von Mühlfeld, who was known as von Mühlfeld since 1803.

References

  (via the Internet Archive)

Austrian naturalists
1780 births
1831 deaths